Domashnyaya Bank is a shoal, covered by only  of water, near Molodezhnaya Station in Enderby Land. It was first charted by the Soviet Antarctic Expedition, 1961–62, which called it "Banka Domashnyaya" (domestic bank), presumably for the nearness of the feature to their station.

References 

Barrier islands of Antarctica
Islands of Enderby Land